Paul Abramson may refer to:
 Paul R. Abramson (born 1949), American professor of psychology
 Paul R. Abramson (political scientist) (1937–2018), American political scientist
 Paul Abramson (politician) (1889–1976), Estonian politician